Stanislav Vasilyevich Kritsyuk (born 1 December 1990) is a Russian professional footballer who plays as a goalkeeper for Portuguese club Gil Vicente.

Club career

He made his Russian Premier League debut for FC Krasnodar on 5 March 2016 in a game against FC Zenit Saint Petersburg.

After finishing the 2015–16 season with FC Krasnodar on loan from Braga, Kritsyuk's rights were bought out by Krasnodar and he signed a 4-year contract with the club on 30 May 2016.

On 20 July 2020, he was released from his Krasnodar contract by mutual consent.

On 29 September 2020, he joined Belenenses SAD.

On 21 June 2021, he signed a 3-year contract with Gil Vicente.

On 2 September 2021, he returned to Russia and signed a one-year deal (with an option to extend for another year) with FC Zenit Saint Petersburg.

On 21 June 2022, Zenit confirmed that Kritsyuk's contract with the club was terminated by mutual consent. On the same day, Gil Vicente confirmed his return.

International
On 11 March 2016, he was called up to the Russia national football team for friendly games against Lithuania and France. He made his debut for the national team on 26 March in a game against Lithuania.

Personal life
On 4 March 2022, after the death of a Ukrainian youth soccer coach, he called for peace following the invasion of Ukraine by Russia, but stopped short of condemning the invasion.

Honours

Club
Braga
Taça da Liga: 2012-13

Zenit Saint Petersburg
Russian Premier League: 2021–22

Career statistics

References

1990 births
Sportspeople from Tolyatti
Living people
Russian footballers
Russia international footballers
Russia youth international footballers
Russia under-21 international footballers
Primeira Liga players
S.C. Braga players
S.C. Braga B players
Rio Ave F.C. players
FC Krasnodar players
Belenenses SAD players
Gil Vicente F.C. players
FC Zenit Saint Petersburg players
Russian expatriate footballers
Expatriate footballers in Portugal
Russian expatriate sportspeople in Portugal
Association football goalkeepers
Russian Premier League players
FC Tolyatti players